Rubicon Township is a civil township of Huron County in the U.S. state of Michigan. The population was 732 at the 2010 census.

Communities
 The village of Port Hope is within the township on M-25.

Geography

Demographics
As of the census of 2000, there were 778 people, 317 households, and 226 families residing in the township. There were 528 housing units at an average density of 22.2 per square mile (8.6/km). The racial makeup of the township was 98.71% White, 0.77% Native American, 0.13% Asian, 0.13% from other races, and 0.26% from two or more races. Hispanic or Latino of any race were 0.26% of the population.

There were 317 households, out of which 28.1% had children under the age of 18 living with them, 62.8% were married couples living together, 5.7% had a female householder with no husband present, and 28.4% were non-families. 24.3% of all households were made up of individuals, and 14.2% had someone living alone who was 65 years of age or older. The average household size was 2.44 and the average family size was 2.88.

In the township the population was spread out, with 23.1% under the age of 18, 5.7% from 18 to 24, 23.8% from 25 to 44, 23.9% from 45 to 64, and 23.5% who were 65 years of age or older. The median age was 43 years. For every 100 females, there were 103.1 males. For every 100 females age 18 and over, there were 103.4 males.

The median income for a household in the township was $33,359, and the median income for a family was $39,000. Males had a median income of $29,886 versus $19,250 for females. The per capita income for the township was $16,012. About 3.0% of families and 4.6% of the population were below the poverty line, including 1.1% of those under age 18 and 7.7% of those age 65 or over.

References

Townships in Huron County, Michigan
Townships in Michigan
Populated places on Lake Huron in the United States